is a train station in Shibecha, Hokkaidō, Japan.

Lines
Hokkaido Railway Company
Senmō Main Line Station B59

Adjacent stations

External links
 JR Hokkaido Kayanuma Station information 

Stations of Hokkaido Railway Company
Railway stations in Hokkaido Prefecture
Railway stations in Japan opened in 1927